Qorqan is a village in the Fuzuli District of Azerbaijan. It was under the occupation of ethnic Armenian forces since the First Nagorno-Karabakh war, however, it was recaptured by Azerbaijan on 7 November 2020.

References

External links 

Populated places in Fuzuli District